The Rise of Central China Plan is a policy adopted by the People's Republic of China to accelerate the development of its central regions. It was announced by Premier Wen Jiabao on 5 March 2004. It covers six provinces: Shanxi, Henan, Anhui, Hubei, Hunan, and Jiangxi.

See also
Economy of China
Bohai Economic Rim
Beibu Gulf Economic Rim
Pearl River Delta Economic Zone
Yangtze River Delta Economic Zone

External links
 China Internet Information Center: China to Boost Rise of Central Region

Economic development in China